Osmola  is a village in the administrative district of Gmina Dziadkowice, within Siemiatycze County, Podlaskie Voivodeship, in north-eastern Poland.

According to the 1921 census, the village was inhabited by 418 people, among whom 401 were Roman Catholic, 7 Orthodox, 1 Greek Catholic, 1 Evangelical and 8 Mosaic. At the same time, 410 inhabitants declared Polish nationality, 8 Jewish. There were 81 residential buildings in the village.

The village has a population of 240.

References

Osmola